The paired (right and left) inferior pulvinary veins are veins that drain blood from the corresponding halves of inferior part of the pulvinar of the thalamus into the corresponding basal vein.

References  

Pulvinary veins